Mark David Haiman is a mathematician at the University of California at Berkeley who proved the
Macdonald positivity conjecture for Macdonald polynomials. He received his Ph.D in 1984 in the Massachusetts Institute of Technology under the direction of Gian-Carlo Rota. Previous to his appointment at Berkeley, he held positions at the University of California, San Diego and the Massachusetts Institute of Technology.

In 2004, he received the inaugural AMS Moore Prize. In 2012, he became a fellow of the American Mathematical Society.

Selected publications

References

External links
 Haiman's home page

Year of birth missing (living people)
Living people
Massachusetts Institute of Technology alumni
University of California, San Diego faculty
20th-century American mathematicians
21st-century American mathematicians
University of California, Berkeley College of Letters and Science faculty
Fellows of the American Mathematical Society